Manuel Afonso de Guerra was a Portuguese Bishop who served as Governor of Portuguese Cape Verde from 1622 until his death on 8 March 1624. This title was held jointly with his role as Bishop of Santiago de Cabo Verde, which he held from 24 February 1616 until his death. He was succeeded as bishop by Lorenzo Garro.

References 

1624 deaths
17th-century Roman Catholic bishops in Portugal
Roman Catholic bishops of Santiago de Cabo Verde
Year of birth unknown
Colonial heads of Cape Verde